Bradburn is a surname. It is the surname of:
Angela Bradburn (born 1968), American high jumper
George Bradburn (1806–1880), American abolitionist politician and Unitarian minister
George Bradburn (1894–1975), English footballer
Grant Bradburn (born 1966), New Zealand cricketer
Juan Davis Bradburn (1787–1842), US-born brigadier general in the Mexican Army
Lenna Bradburn (born 1960), Canada's first female police chief
Mary Bradburn (1918–2000), British mathematics educator
Norman Bradburn (born 1933), American social scientist and academic administrator
Samuel Bradburn (1751–1816), Gibraltar-born Methodist preacher
Thomas Evans Bradburn (1853–1933), business owner and politician in Ontario, Canada
Wynne Bradburn (1938–2008), New Zealand cricketer